The 'DesmoDue Championship' is a one-make motorcycle racing series based in the United Kingdom. The series was started by the Ducati Sporting Club in 2005 and is administered by them. The series has been hosted by various clubs and is currently run at NG Road Racing  meetings.

The motorcycles must be based on an air-cooled 2-valve Ducati twin-cylinder engine produced since 1992. The machines are allowed limited modifications in order to maintain parity. The series also uses a spec / control which is currently the Dunlop Sportsmart TT (Dunlop Wets are also allowed).

There are two engine capacity classes;
Class A - 618cc fuel injection based machines
Class B - 583cc carburettor based machines

Riders must hold an ACU racing licence.

Lap Records

Champions - Class A

Champions - Class B

References

Ducati (company)
Motorcycle road racing series
Motorsport competitions in the United Kingdom
One-make series